Ellicott's Stone, also known as the Ellicott Stone, is a boundary marker in northern Mobile County, Alabama.  It was placed on April 10, 1799 by a joint U.S.-Spanish survey party headed by Andrew Ellicott. It was designated as a National Historic Civil Engineering Landmark in 1968 and was added to the National Register of Historic Places on April 11, 1973.

It is the only known stone monument set by Ellicott when he surveyed the 31st parallel north latitude, which served as the boundary line between the  Mississippi Territory in the United States and Spanish West Florida. The boundary line extended along the 31st parallel from the Mississippi River east to the Chattahoochee River, as set forth in the 1795 Pinckney Treaty, formally known as the Treaty of San Lorenzo.

Ellicott's Stone is the initial point for all United States Public Land surveys in the southern region of Alabama and Mississippi. It is the point of intersection of what is known today as the St. Stephens meridian and the St. Stephens baseline. All townships in the area are numbered from the stone.

The park was established in 1917. It is now near the James M. Barry Electric Generating Plant, west of the Mobile River.

Description
On the northern side of the stone is an inscription stating "U.S. Lat. 31, 1799." The inscription on the southern side reads "Dominio De S.M. Carlos IV, Lat. 31, 1799." (Dominion of his majesty King Charles IV, Lat. 31, 1799)

References

External links

1799 establishments in the United States
1799 in the United States
Historic Civil Engineering Landmarks
Pre-statehood history of Alabama
Historic surveying landmarks in the United States
Circles of latitude
Monuments and memorials in Alabama
National Register of Historic Places in Mobile County, Alabama